Irma Steinberg Raker (born April 28, 1938) is a Senior Judge of the Maryland Court of Appeals, the state's highest court. In 2007, she was awarded the American Bar Association's Margaret Brent Award for outstanding women lawyers who have achieved professional excellence and paved the way for other women in the legal profession.

She was born Irma Steinberg in Brooklyn, New York, and attended local schools including Midwood High School. She graduated from Syracuse University in 1959 and studied at The Hague Academy of International Law.

Steinberg interrupted her education to marry Samuel K. Raker and oversee the early development of their three children. She then returned to her studies, earning a J.D. degree from the American University in Washington, D.C. in 1972. She was admitted to the Maryland bar the next year.

Raker served as an Assistant State's Attorney for Montgomery County, Maryland from 1973 to 1979. Judge Raker took the bench when she was appointed a trial judge in Maryland's District Court of Maryland and then the Circuit Court for Montgomery County. She served in a number of increasingly responsible judicial positions until Governor Schaefer appointed her to the Maryland Court of Appeals, the state's highest court. She became a Senior Judge in 2008 and currently sits by designation.

Judge Raker currently serves as the Chairperson of the Maryland Access to Justice Commission.  She is actively engaged in private mediation and arbitration.

References

External links

1938 births
Living people
20th-century American Jews
Judges of the Maryland Court of Appeals
The Hague Academy of International Law people
Washington College of Law alumni
Women in Maryland politics
Midwood High School alumni
Syracuse University alumni
People from Brooklyn
People from Rockville, Maryland
20th-century American judges
21st-century American judges
21st-century American women
21st-century American Jews
20th-century American women judges